Henry Jacques Ninio (born 27 October 1935) was the 75th Lord Mayor of the City of Adelaide, South Australia.
Henry Ninio was born in Cairo on 27 October 1935. He migrated with his family to Adelaide in 1956. He completed his university pharmacy studies in Adelaide. He established the Piaf Perfumery chain and Simes Australia with his business partner Alex Siros.

He served as Councillor in Gray ward on the Adelaide City Council and then Alderman before being elected Lord Mayor in 1993. He also served as the president of Beit Shalom Synagogue in 1983.

The French Government has honoured him for his services to perfumery and the French community of Australia.
He has 3 children and 6 grandchildren. His daughter, Jacqueline, is a rabbi at the Emanuel Synagogue in Sydney.

References

External links

Australian people of Egyptian-Jewish descent
Mayors and Lord Mayors of Adelaide
1935 births
Living people
Egyptian emigrants to Australia
Egyptian Jews
Jewish Australian politicians